Samiu Mohi (born circa 1962) is a Tongan former rugby union player. He played as centre.

Career
Mohi's first test cap for Tonga was on 12 June 1986, against Wales, in Nuku'alofa. He was also part of the 1987 Rugby World Cup Tonga squad, where he played all the three pool matches, with his last test cap being against Ireland, on 3 June 1987, in Ballymore.

References

External links
Samiu Mohi international stats

1962 births
Living people
Tongan rugby union players
Rugby union centres
Tonga international rugby union players